Myles Lewis George Kenlock is an English professional footballer who plays as a left back for National League club Aldershot Town.

Club career

Ipswich Town
Born in Lambeth, Kenlock was a schoolboy at Crystal Palace before leaving the club and becoming a graduate of Croydon-based charity Kinetic Foundation. He joined the Ipswich Town Academy in April 2014.

On 24 August 2015, Kenlock signed a two-year professional contract with Ipswich Town, with an option for a further 12 months. Kenlock made his competitive Ipswich debut against Stevenage on 11 August 2015 in the first round of the Football League Cup. He made his league debut for Ipswich on 30 April, starting in a 3–2 home win over Milton Keynes Dons at Portman Road. Kenlock made 5 appearances during his first season in professional football.

Kenlock managed to break into the first team squad during the 2016–17 season. In March 2017, Kenlock signed a new contract with Ipswich, keeping him at the club until 2019, with the option of an additional one-year extension. Although primarily being behind first choice left back Jonas Knudsen in the starting lineup, he made 18 appearances over the course of the season.

He made his first appearance of the 2017–18 season on 8 August, starting in a 2–0 away win over Luton Town in an EFL Cup first round tie. He continued to feature for the first-team as a squad player during the 2017–18 season, making 18 appearances across all competitions.

Following the arrival of Paul Hurst in 2018, Kenlock saw game time limited, only making a single substitute appearance during Hurst's time in charge of the club. Following the departure of Paul Hurst and the arrival of Paul Lambert, he saw more involvement in the first team squad. He was given a consistent run of games towards the second half of the 2018–19 season, making 19 appearances over the course of the season. His improvement throughout the season earned him a one-year extension on his contract, keeping him at the club until 2020.

On 17 July 2019, Kenlock signed a new three-year contract with the club, with the option of a further year extension. He started at left back in the first game of the 2019–20 season as Ipswich won 1–0 away at Burton Albion. Despite starting the first 7 games of the season, Kenlock struggled for consistent game time during the second-half of the season, only making two further league appearances before the season was suspended in March due to the Coronavirus outbreak. He made 17 appearances in all competitions over the course of the season. Kenlock made his 100th appearance for Ipswich on 4 May 2021, playing the full match in a 0–0 draw with Shrewsbury Town.

During the summer of 2021, Kenlock was told by new manager Paul Cook that he was not in his plans for the upcoming season, and was instructed to train with the club's U23s alongside multiple other first team players such as Flynn Downes. Kenlock was subsequently not allocated a squad number for the 2021–22 season, leaving him ineligible to play a league game for the club until January 2022.

Colchester United (loan)
On 20 January 2022, having made only two appearances for Ipswich during the season, all of which came in the EFL Trophy, Kenlock joined Colchester United on loan for the rest of the 2021–22 season. He made his debut two days later where he scored his first senior goal in a 3–0 win over Salford City.

On 5 May 2022, Ipswich confirmed that Kenlock would be released following the expiration of his contract, ending his 8-year association with the club.

Barrow
On 4 August 2022, Kenlock joined League Two side Barrow on a free transfer.

Aldershot Town
On 10 March 2023, Kenlock signed for National League club Aldershot Town on a contract till the end of the season.

Career statistics

References

External links
Myles Kenlock profile at the Ipswich Town F.C. website

1996 births
Living people
Footballers from Lambeth
English footballers
Association football defenders
Ipswich Town F.C. players
Colchester United F.C. players
Barrow A.F.C. players
English Football League players